Abouna Gabriel Abdel El-Metgaly (30 March 1918 – 3 September 1978) was an Egyptian hegumen of the Coptic Orthodox Church.

Early life 

El-Metgaly was born in the village of Tend, Mallawi. He completed his secondary in 1936. He joined the Coptic Orthodox Church Clerical Council in 1937 and studied there until 1941.

Death and legacy
Due to the sectarian strife of 1978, a group of Muslims attacked the priest's house. He and his wife were beaten with sticks and sharp instruments. El-Metgaly died from the attack.

In 2018, his body was transferred to the Church of the Archangel Gabriel in Minya. It was said that his body had not decomposed.

References

1918 births
1978 deaths
20th-century Christian martyrs
Coptic Orthodox saints
Military saints
Coptic Orthodox Christians from Egypt
Christian saints killed by Muslims